Marco Klepoch (born 3 November 1997) is a Slovak figure skater. He is the 2018 Crystal Skate of Romania champion, the 2014 New Year's Cup silver medalist, and a four-time Slovak national champion (2013–2015, 2019). He has appeared at five ISU Championships.

Career
On the ice from the age of five, Klepoch began skating because his father wanted him to learn a variety of sports. His first instructor was Eva Takáčová and then Vladimir Dvojnikov. He is a member of ŠKP Bratislava's skating club and trains at the Vladimír Dzurilla ice rink in Bratislava.

Programs

Competitive highlights 
CS: Challenger Series; JGP: Junior Grand Prix

References

External links 
 

1997 births
Slovak male single skaters
Living people
Figure skaters from Bratislava
Competitors at the 2017 Winter Universiade
Competitors at the 2019 Winter Universiade